John F. Barros (born 1973) is an American politician, businessman, and civic organizer who was formerly the chief of economic development for the City of Boston. He also served as the executive director of the Dudley Street Neighborhood Initiative. He unsuccessfully ran for mayor of Boston in 2013 and 2021. He is currently the managing principal for the Boston office of the real estate firm Cushman & Wakefield.

Early years and education 
John Barros is the son of immigrant parents from the Cape Verde Islands. His father came to Cape Cod in the 1950s to work in the cranberry bogs. Barros's parents later moved to Boston, raising John and his four siblings in the Boston neighborhood of Roxbury. He attended public school until his mid teens when he entered Boston College High school. After completing his education at BC High, Barros then went on to attend Dartmouth College in Hanover New Hampshire. At Dartmouth, John majored in Economics and African-African American studies. On campus he performed in the Black Underground Theater Association, served as president of the African-American Society and was an active member of the Senior Honor Society, Casque and Gauntlet (C&G). John is a candidate for a master's degree in Public Policy at Tufts University.

Barros first became involved in the Dudley Street Neighborhood Initiative (DSNI) at the age of fourteen. By the age of seventeen, he was serving on its board. He was the first youth elected to its board. As a board member of the DSNI, he was featured in the 1996 documentary "Holding Ground", which focused on the DSNI.

Early career
In 1996 Barros began working as executive liability underwriter for the Chubb Group of Insurance Companies in New York City. He worked there through 1999. He worked with dot-com startups such as Priceline.com.

In 1999, he returned to Boston to assume the position of executive director of the Dudley Street Neighborhood Initiative in 1999. During his time working as executive director, Barros was featured in the 2012 documentary "Gaining Ground", another documentary which focused on the DNSI. He quit his job with the DSNI in order to launch a 2013 campaign for mayor.

Barros worked on Barack Obama's 2008 presidential campaign.

In January 2010, Barros was appointed to the Boston School Committee. He was a first Cape Verdean to serve on the committee. He resigned this position in April 2013, in preparation for his mayoral campaign.

Barros co-owns, with his brothers, Restaurante Cesaria, in Boston. He has co-owned it since 2002.

Barros is a Barr Foundation fellow.

2013 mayoral campaign

Barros, a Democrat, ran the first of his two unsuccessful campaigns in Boston's nonpartisan mayoral elections in 2013. In April 2013 Barros announced his intention to run for mayor of the City of Boston. He failed to make it past the nonpartisan primary into the general election, placing sixth in the primary, with 8.10% of the vote. In the primary, The Boston Globe made a dual-endorsement of both Barros and John R. Connolly.

After being eliminated, Barros endorsed Marty Walsh in the general election. After Walsh became mayor, he made Barros his chief of economic development.

Boston chief of economic development
After failing to make the general election himself in his 2013 mayoral bid, Barros endorsed and campaigned heavily for Marty Walsh, who won the election. Barros's own campaign had elevated his notability, and, while he seemed likely to be offered a position in Walsh's administration, it was also, initially, speculated that Barros might instead make another run for elected office, with speculation circulating about a possible run for lieutenant governor or a run in the special election for the Massachusetts House of Representatives seat vacated by Carlos Henriquez.

In February 2014, Boston mayor Marty Walsh appointed Barros as the city's chief of economic development. The position included purview over the Boston Redevelopment Authority. The position oversaw economic development in the city, and also was tasked with coordinating efforts across numerous city departments. Barros's first day on the job was February 11, 2014. He was the first person to hold this new position. In February 2021, Barros resigned in order to launch his second candidacy for mayor of Boston.

As chief of economic development, Barros claimed that his top priorities included economic equity, neighborhood development, and innovation.

Early into his tenure, Barros stated his desire for businesses to extend their opening hours later into the night.

The Boston Globe jointly named Barros, Jay Ash, Steve Kadish, and Dan Koh its 2016 "Bostonians of the Year", crediting them with having been behind the deal which brought General Electric's headquarters to the city, each having done so, "with marching orders from their bosses". In 2018, Boston magazine ran ranked Barros 15th on its list of "The 100 Most Influential People in Boston", writing 

Barros co-chaired the Imagine Boston 2030 citywide vision planning blueprint.

Barros worked in partnership with MassChallenge to work to, "expand innovation efforts in Boston." He also worked with MassRobotics on putting together their proposal for a grant for their MassWorks program.

Disclosed emails show Barros playing a role in coordinating with other Massachusetts cities about Boston's bid for the 2024 Summer Olympics.

2021 mayoral campaign

In March 2021, Barros announced he would run for mayor in the 2021 Boston mayoral election. If elected he would become the first black man to become mayor of Boston. In a September 10, 2021 article, Ellen Barry of the New York Times described Barros as having, "struggled to get traction." On the day of the primary election, Gregory Krieg of CNN described Barros as, "a heavy underdog". On the day of the primary election, The Boston Globe characterized him as, "trailing the pack" in opinion polls. However, in the days leading up to the election, Barros expressed confidence, questioning the accuracy of polling. Barros ultimately placed fifth, with over 3% of the vote.

Subsequent career
In November 2021, Barros became managing principal of the Boston office of the real estate firm Cushman & Wakefield. In January 2022, Barros became the first-ever visiting professional at Boston College's Joseph E. Corcoran Center for Real Estate and Urban Action at the Carroll School of Management.

Awards and recognition
Among the awards and recognition Barros has received are the inaugural Community Service Award from the Boston Day & Evening Academy in 2008; the Robert Leo Ruffin Award from the Archdiocese of Boston in 2004; and the Action for Boston Community Development Roxbury Community Award in 2000.

Personal life
Barros married his wife, Tchintcia, in 2011.

Electoral history

References

1973 births
American people of Cape Verdean descent
American politicians of Cape Verdean descent
Candidates in the 2021 United States elections
Living people
Boston School Committee members
People from Roxbury, Boston
21st-century African-American politicians
21st-century American politicians
20th-century African-American people